Planetary-surface construction is the construction of artificial habitats and other structures on planetary surfaces. Planetary surface construction can be divided into three phases or classes, coinciding with a phased schedule for habitation:

• Class I: Pre-integrated hard shell modules ready to use immediately upon delivery.

• Class II: Prefabricated kit-of-parts that is surface assembled after delivery.

• Class III: in-situ resource utilization (ISRU) derived structure with integrated Earth components.

Class I structures are prepared and tested on Earth, and are designed to be fully self-contained habitats that can be delivered to the surface of other planets. In an initial mission to put human explorers on Mars, a Class I habitat would provide the bare minimum habitable facilities when continued support from Earth is not possible.

The Class II structures call for a pre-manufactured kit-of-parts system that has flexible capacity for demountability and reuse. Class II structures can be used to expand the facilities established by the initial Class I habitat, and can allow for the assembly of additional structures either before the crew arrives, or after their occupancy of the pre-integrated habitat.

The purpose of Class III structures is to allow for the construction of additional facilities that would support a larger population, and to develop the capacity for the local production of building materials and structures without the need for resupply from Earth.

To facilitate the development of technology required to implement the three phases, Cohen and Kennedy (1997) stress the need to explore robust robotic system concepts that can be used to assist in the construction process, or perform the tasks autonomously. Among other things, they suggest a roadmap that stresses the need for adapting structural components for robotic assembly, and determining appropriate levels of modularity, assembly, and component packaging. The roadmap also sets the development of experimental construction systems in parallel with components as an important milestone.

See also
Inflatable space habitat
Aerospace architecture
Space architecture
Human spaceflight

Spaceport
Ground station
Airborne observatory
Mars to Stay
Underwater construction
Offshore construction
Underground construction

References

Citations 
M.M. Cohen; K.J. Kennedy (1997).  Habitats and Surface Construction Technology and Development Roadmap.  In A. Noor, J. Malone (Eds.), Government Sponsored Programs on Structures Technology (NASA CP-97-206241, p. 75-96).  Washington, DC, USA: National Aeronautics and Space Administration.
K.J. Kennedy (2002).  The Vernacular of Space Architecture (AIAA 2002-6102).  1st Space Architecture Symposium (SAS 2002), Houston, Texas, USA, 10–11 October 2002.  Reston, Virginia, USA: American Institute of Aeronautics and Astronautics.
A. Smith (1993). Mechanics of Materials in Lunar Base Design. in H. Benaroya (Ed.) Applied Mechanics of a Lunar Base, Applied Mechanics Review, Vol 46, No 6. pp. 268–271.

External links
 Space Architecture

Fictional buildings and structures
Construction
Space colonization
Industry in space